Minus the Herd is the third studio album by the Canadian mathcore band Ion Dissonance, released on June 5, 2007 through Abacus Recordings. Minus the Herd sold over 1,900 copies its first week of release, peaking at #22 on the Billboard 200 Heatseekers Charts. A music video was made for Kneel in 2007, and was released the same year viva Abacus Recording's YouTube channel. This album finishes the departure from their technical and chaotic mathcore sound in favor of groovy and heavy djent sound, which started at the previous album, Solace.

Track listing

Personnel
 Kevin McCaughey – vocals
 Antoine Lussier – guitar
 Sebastien Chaput – guitar
 Xavier St-Laurent – bass
 Jean-François Richard – drums
 Producer - Zeuss

References

2007 albums
Ion Dissonance albums